Byrd in Hand is an album by Donald Byrd. Engineered by Rudy Van Gelder, it was recorded in May 1959 and was released in 1959 as catalogue BLP 4019 (mono) and BST 84019 (stereo). It was remastered in 2002 and released on CD as Blue Note 42305.

Reception
The Penguin Guide to Jazz described the recording as a "typical Blue Note blowing session". The AllMusic reviewer wrote that "Although none of the new tunes caught on, the group [...] plays consistently creative and spirited solos in the hard bop idiom."

Track listing
"Witchcraft" (Cy Coleman, Carolyn Leigh) 8:29
"Here I Am"  (Byrd) 8:25
"Devil Whip"  (Byrd) 4:42
"Bronze Dance" (Walter Davis, Jr.) 6:42
"Clarion Calls" (Walter Davis, Jr.) 5:41
"The Injuns" (Byrd) 6:13

Personnel 
 Donald Byrd - trumpet
 Charlie Rouse - tenor saxophone
 Pepper Adams - baritone saxophone
 Walter Davis, Jr. - piano
 Sam Jones - bass
 Art Taylor - drums

References

1960 albums
Albums produced by Alfred Lion
Albums recorded at Van Gelder Studio
Blue Note Records albums
Donald Byrd albums